Toofan is a 2002 Pakistani Urdu film  starring Shaan, Saima, Resham, Laila, and Arbaaz Khan.

Cast
 Shaan as Mujrem Daud
 Saima
 Resham
 Nargis
 Laila
 Arbaaz Khan as ASP Arbaaz
 Moammar Rana as Ashwani
 Asif Khan
 Shafqat Cheema as (Ashwani partner)

References

External links

2002 films
Pakistani action films
2002 action films
2000s Urdu-language films